Metaphryno is a genus of parasitic flies in the family Tachinidae.

Species
Metaphryno bella Crosskey, 1967

Distribution
Australia.

References

Monotypic Brachycera genera
Diptera of Australasia
Exoristinae
Tachinidae genera
Taxa named by Roger Ward Crosskey